The following species in the flowering plant genus Lepidium are accepted by Plants of the World Online. Speciation in this genus is marked by allopolyploidization.

Lepidium abrotanifolium 
Lepidium acutidens 
Lepidium aegrum 
Lepidium affghanum 
Lepidium affine 
Lepidium afghanicum 
Lepidium africanum 
Lepidium alashanicum 
Lepidium alluaudii 
Lepidium altissimum 
Lepidium alyssoides 
Lepidium amelum 
Lepidium amissum 
Lepidium amplexicaule 
Lepidium angolense 
Lepidium angustissimum 
Lepidium apetalum 
Lepidium appelianum 
Lepidium apterum 
Lepidium arbuscula 
Lepidium arequipa 
Lepidium argentinum 
Lepidium armoracium 
Lepidium aschersonii 
Lepidium aucheri 
Lepidium auriculatum 
Lepidium austrinum 
Lepidium banksii 
Lepidium barnebyanum 
Lepidium basuticum 
Lepidium beamanii 
Lepidium beckii 
Lepidium bidentatum 
Lepidium bipinnatifidum 
Lepidium bipinnatum 
Lepidium biplicatum 
Lepidium boelckeanum 
Lepidium boelckei 
Lepidium bonariense 
Lepidium botschantsevianum 
Lepidium botschantzevii 
Lepidium brachyotum 
Lepidium bupleuroides 
Lepidium burkartii 
Lepidium buschianum 
Lepidium caespitosum 
Lepidium campestre 
Lepidium capense 
Lepidium capitatum 
Lepidium cardamine 
Lepidium cardiophyllum 
Lepidium cartilagineum 
Lepidium castellanum 
Lepidium catapycnon 
Lepidium chalepense 
Lepidium chichicara 
Lepidium cordatum 
Lepidium coronopifolium 
Lepidium coronopus 
Lepidium costaricense 
Lepidium crassius 
Lepidium crassum 
Lepidium crenatum 
Lepidium culminicola 
Lepidium cumingianum 
Lepidium cuneiforme 
Lepidium curvinervium 
Lepidium cuzcoensis 
Lepidium cyclocarpum 
Lepidium davisii 
Lepidium densiflorum 
Lepidium densipuberulum 
Lepidium depressum 
Lepidium desertorum 
Lepidium desvauxii 
Lepidium dictyotum 
Lepidium didymum 
Lepidium draba 
Lepidium drummondii 
Lepidium eastwoodiae 
Lepidium echinatum 
Lepidium ecklonii 
Lepidium ecuadorense 
Lepidium englerianum 
Lepidium fasciculatum 
Lepidium fenestratum 
Lepidium ferganense 
Lepidium filicaule 
Lepidium filisegmentum 
Lepidium flavum 
Lepidium flexicaule 
Lepidium flexuosum 
Lepidium foliosum 
Lepidium fraseri 
Lepidium fremontii 
Lepidium galapagoensis 
Lepidium genistoides 
Lepidium ginninderrense 
Lepidium glastifolium 
Lepidium gracile 
Lepidium graminifolium 
Lepidium grandifructum 
Lepidium heterophyllum 
Lepidium hickenii 
Lepidium hirtum 
Lepidium howei-insulae 
Lepidium huberi 
Lepidium hypenantion 
Lepidium hyssopifolium 
Lepidium integrifolium 
Lepidium inyangense 
Lepidium jaredii 
Lepidium jarmolenkoi 
Lepidium johnstonii 
Lepidium jujuyanum 
Lepidium juvencum 
Lepidium karataviense 
Lepidium karelinianum 
Lepidium kawarau 
Lepidium keniense 
Lepidium kirkii 
Lepidium lacerum 
Lepidium laeteviride 
Lepidium lapazianum 
Lepidium lasiocarpum 
Lepidium latifolium 
Lepidium latipes 
Lepidium lepidioides 
Lepidium leptopetalum 
Lepidium leventii 
Lepidium limenophylax 
Lepidium linearilobum 
Lepidium linifolium 
Lepidium lipskyi 
Lepidium litwinowii 
Lepidium longifolium 
Lepidium lyratogynum 
Lepidium lyratum 
Lepidium maccowagei 
Lepidium macrocarpum 
Lepidium makateanum 
Lepidium matau 
Lepidium merrallii 
Lepidium meyenii 
Lepidium meyeri 
Lepidium minor 
Lepidium minutiflorum 
Lepidium monoplocoides 
Lepidium montanum 
Lepidium mossii 
Lepidium muelleriferdinandii 
Lepidium mummenhoffianum 
Lepidium myrianthum 
Lepidium myriocarpum 
Lepidium nanum 
Lepidium naufragorum 
Lepidium navasii 
Lepidium nesophilum 
Lepidium niloticum 
Lepidium nitidum 
Lepidium oblitum 
Lepidium oblongum 
Lepidium obtusatum 
Lepidium obtusum 
Lepidium oleraceum 
Lepidium olgae 
Lepidium oligodontum 
Lepidium orientale 
Lepidium ostleri 
Lepidium oxycarpum 
Lepidium oxytrichum 
Lepidium paniculatum 
Lepidium panniforme 
Lepidium papilliferum 
Lepidium papillosum 
Lepidium parodii 
Lepidium patrinioides 
Lepidium pavlovii 
Lepidium paysonii 
Lepidium pedersenii 
Lepidium pedicellosum 
Lepidium peregrinum 
Lepidium perfoliatum 
Lepidium persicum 
Lepidium philippianum 
Lepidium phlebopetalum 
Lepidium pholidogynum 
Lepidium pinnatifidum 
Lepidium pinnatisectum 
Lepidium pinnatum 
Lepidium platypetalum 
Lepidium propinquum 
Lepidium pseudodidymum 
Lepidium pseudohyssopifolium 
Lepidium pseudopapillosum 
Lepidium pseudoruderale 
Lepidium pseudotasmanicum 
Lepidium pterocarpum 
Lepidium puberulum 
Lepidium pubescens 
Lepidium pumilum 
Lepidium quitense 
Lepidium rahmeri 
Lepidium ramosissimum 
Lepidium reichei 
Lepidium rekohuense 
Lepidium rhytidocarpum 
Lepidium rigidum 
Lepidium robustum 
Lepidium rotundum 
Lepidium ruderale 
Lepidium sagittatum 
Lepidium sagittulatum 
Lepidium santacruzensis 
Lepidium sativum 
Lepidium scandens 
Lepidium schaffneri 
Lepidium schinzii 
Lepidium schlechteri 
Lepidium seditiosum 
Lepidium serra 
Lepidium serratum 
Lepidium seydelii 
Lepidium silaifolium 
Lepidium sisymbrioides 
Lepidium solomonii 
Lepidium songaricum 
Lepidium sordidum 
Lepidium spathulatum 
Lepidium spicatum 
Lepidium spinosum 
Lepidium steinbachii 
Lepidium stephan-beckii 
Lepidium strictum 
Lepidium strongylophyllum 
Lepidium stuckertianum 
Lepidium subalpinum 
Lepidium subcordatum 
Lepidium subulatum 
Lepidium suluense 
Lepidium tandilense 
Lepidium tenuicaule 
Lepidium thurberi 
Lepidium tianschanicum 
Lepidium tiehmii 
Lepidium tofaceum 
Lepidium tolmaczovii 
Lepidium transvaalense 
Lepidium trautvetteri 
Lepidium trianae 
Lepidium trifurcum 
Lepidium uzbekistanicum 
Lepidium vesicarium 
Lepidium villarsii 
Lepidium violaceum 
Lepidium virginicum 
Lepidium werffii 
Lepidium xylodes 
Lepidium zambiense

References

Lepidium